Krisnan Nevada Inu (born 17 March 1987) is a professional rugby league footballer who plays as a  or er for the Leigh Centurions in the RFL Championship. He has played for both New Zealand and Samoa at international level. On 24  February 2022, it was announced that Inu had signed with immediate effect for Leigh in the Betfred Championship.

He has previously played the Parramatta Eels, Canterbury-Bankstown Bulldogs and the New Zealand Warriors in the NRL, and the Catalans Dragons and the Widnes Vikings in the Super League. Inu is one of two players who have lost grand finals with three clubs. He was a member of the 2008 World Cup-winning New Zealand squad.

Inu has also played rugby union for Stade Français of the Top 14 competition in France.

Background
Inu was born in Auckland, New Zealand and is of Samoan and Tuvalu descent.

Playing career

Parramatta Eels
A Parramatta Eels junior, Inu made his first grade debut in the 2007 NRL season against the Canberra Raiders. After just one first grade match he was named to play for New Zealand in the ANZAC Day Test against Australia at Suncorp Stadium in Brisbane. The Kangaroos ran out easy 30-6 winners over the Kiwis. After the test, Inu was dropped back to Premier League but returned to first grade through a series of injuries to regular players. Inu took on the kicking duties as Parramatta's primary kicker and full-back, Luke Burt, was injured mid-season. In round 25 Inu scored three tries and kicked seven goals in Parramatta's 46-point win over Brisbane.

Inu played in Parramatta's 2007 preliminary final defeat by Melbourne at Docklands Stadium. In August 2008, Inu was named in the New Zealand training squad for the 2008 Rugby League World Cup, and in October 2008, he was named in the final 24-man Kiwi squad that went on to win the tournament, playing one game in their win against Papua New Guinea.

After a 2-4 start to the 2009 season, Parramatta decided to re-tool their line-up, dropping Inu to the New South Wales Cup, with Taulima Tautai replacing him for the round 7 match against the Brisbane Broncos.  Inu played in the 2009 NRL Grand Final for Parramatta against the Melbourne Storm at centre.  At the end of the 2010 season, Inu told coach Daniel Anderson that he would be joining The New Zealand Warriors on a two year deal.

New Zealand Warriors
Inu played in New Zealand's 2011 NRL grand final loss to The Manly-Warringah Sea Eagles. Inu's up-and-down tenure at the Warriors was curtailed in May 2012 with his release and immediate signing with the Canterbury-Bankstown Bulldogs.

Canterbury-Bankstown Bulldogs
Inu was released by the Warriors in May 2012 so he could immediately join the Des Hasler coached Canterbury side.

He signed with the Canterbury outfit until the end of the 2015 season.  Inu played in the 2012 NRL Grand Final for Canterbury which they lost 14-4 against Melbourne.

Catalans Dragons
Inu returned to rugby league and was signed by Catalans Dragons in June 2015 to add depth to a depleted squad.  On 17 November 2017, Inu signed a two year deal to join The Widnes Vikings.

Widnes Vikings
On 4 April 2018, Inu broke his leg in a match against Warrington.  Before the injury, Inu had scored six tries in nine games.

Salford Red Devils
On 27 March 2019, it was announced on the Salford Red Devils official website that Inu, signed a contract with immediate effect. He joined the Super League club on a deal that would see him return to the Super League after previous stints with the Catalans Dragons, and Widnes.

Inu played in the 2019 Super League Grand Final defeat by St. Helens at Old Trafford.

On 17 October 2020, Inu played in the 2020 Challenge Cup Final defeat for Salford against Leeds at Wembley Stadium.

FC Lézignan XIII
On 28 October 2021, it was reported that he had signed for FC Lézignan XIII in the Elite One Championship

Leigh
In February 2022, Inu signed a one-year deal with Leigh in the RFL Championship.
On 28 May 2022, Inu played for Leigh in their 2022 RFL 1895 Cup final victory over Featherstone.
On 3 July, Inu scored a hat-trick and kicked eight goals in Leigh's 56-6 victory over Bradford.  On 10 July, Inu successfully kicked all eleven conversion attempts in Leigh's 66-10 victory over Workington Town.

Goal kicking style
Inu is known for smiling and laughing before attempting a conversion at goal.  This was first revealed during the 2007 NRL season.  It later became his trademark and some media Sydney media outlets dubbed him "The Smiling assassin".  Inu explained his reason behind this saying "It started at training, Every time I practised kicking, the first thing I'd try to do is kick from the sideline and everyone would start bagging me out and I would start laughing.  It's the same when the crowd starts booing. I just start smiling and laughing. If they are going to boo me I might as well laugh about it and if I get it over it just shows them up so I can laugh even more".

References

External links

Salford Red Devils profile
Catalans Dragons profile
Parramatta Eels profile
SL profile

1987 births
Living people
Auckland rugby league team players
Cabramatta Two Blues players
Canterbury-Bankstown Bulldogs players
Catalans Dragons players
Expatriate rugby league players in Australia
Leigh Leopards players
Lézignan Sangliers players
New Zealand expatriate rugby league players
New Zealand expatriate sportspeople in Australia
New Zealand Latter Day Saints
New Zealand national rugby league team players
New Zealand people of Indian descent
New Zealand people of Tuvaluan descent
New Zealand sportspeople of Samoan descent
New Zealand rugby league players
New Zealand rugby union players
New Zealand Warriors players
Parramatta Eels players
Rugby league centres
Rugby league players from Auckland
Rugby league wingers
Rugby union players from Auckland
Samoa national rugby league team players
Stade Français players
Wentworthville Magpies players